Kim Rang (born October 9, 1974) is a South Korean handball player who competed in the 1996 Summer Olympics.

In 1996 she was part of the South Korean team which who the silver medal. She played all five matches and scored 14 goals.

External links
Profile

1974 births
Living people
South Korean female handball players
Olympic handball players of South Korea
Handball players at the 1996 Summer Olympics
Olympic silver medalists for South Korea
Olympic medalists in handball
Asian Games medalists in handball
Handball players at the 1994 Asian Games
Medalists at the 1996 Summer Olympics
Asian Games gold medalists for South Korea
Medalists at the 1994 Asian Games